Melinta Therapeutics, founded in 2000 as Rib-X Pharmaceuticals, is an American publicly traded biopharmaceutical firm that focuses on the design and development of novel broad-spectrum antibiotics for the treatment of antibiotic-resistant infections in hospital and community settings. The company is located in New Haven, Connecticut.

In mid-2011, Sanofi entered into a global research collaboration and licensing option with the company to develop and commercialize novel antibiotics.  It was renamed Melinta Therapeutics in 2013.

One of its products, delafloxacin (Baxdela), a fluoroquinolone antibiotic acquired from Wakunaga Pharmaceutical in 2006, was approved by the FDA in 2017.

As of 2016, the company was also developing radezolid, a next-generation oxazolidinone for bacterial acne.

Melinta shredded off its discovery research team in late 2018.
It also moved its headquarters from New Haven to Morristown, New Jersey in early 2019.

On December 27, 2019, Melinta Therapeutics filed for Chapter 11 bankruptcy protection.

On April 2020, it was transferred to affiliates of its creditor Deerfield Management.

References

External links
 

Pharmaceutical companies based in New Jersey
Pharmaceutical companies of the United States
Pharmaceutical companies established in 2000
Companies that filed for Chapter 11 bankruptcy in 2019
Morristown, New Jersey
Companies based in Morris County, New Jersey
2000 establishments in Connecticut